Olha Rozshchupkina (born 26 March 1984) is a Ukrainian former artistic gymnast. She competed at the 2000 Summer Olympics, where she placed 7th in the all-around and 6th in the uneven bars event final.

She won women's team and balance beam bronze medal at the 1999 World Championships.

According to Rozshchupkina’s Facebook page, she now lives in Canada working as a gymnastics coach for Queen City Gymnastics in Regina, Saskatchewan.

See also
List of Olympic female gymnasts for Ukraine

References

1984 births
Living people
Olympic gymnasts of Ukraine
Ukrainian female artistic gymnasts
Gymnasts at the 2000 Summer Olympics
21st-century Ukrainian women